The satellite revisit period is the time elapsed between observations of the same point on Earth by a satellite. It depends on the satellite's orbit, target location, and swath of the sensor.

"Revisit" is related to the same ground trace, a projection of the satellite's orbit on to the Earth.  Revisit requires a very close repeat of the ground trace.   In the case of polar orbit or highly inclined low Earth orbit reconnaissance satellites, the sensor must have the variable swath, to look longitudinally (east-west, or sideways) at a target, in addition to direct overflight observation, looking nadir. 

In the case of the Israeli EROS Earth observation satellite, the ground trace repeat is 15 days, but the actual revisit time is 3 days, because of the swath ability of the camera payload.

See also
Orbit period
 Satellite watching, spotting satellites in the sky as they pass

References

Satellites
Orbits